In mathematics, an Artin–Schreier curve is a plane curve defined over an algebraically closed field of characteristic  by an equation

for some rational function  over that field.

One of the most important examples of such curves is hyperelliptic curves in characteristic 2, whose Jacobian varieties have been suggested for use in cryptography. It is common to write these curves in the form

Definition 
More generally, an Artin-Schreier curve defined over an algebraically closed field of characteristic  is a branched covering

of the projective line of degree . Such a cover is necessarily cyclic, that is, the Galois group of the corresponding algebraic function field extension is the cyclic group . In other words,  is an Artin–Schreier extension.

The fundamental theorem of Artin–Schreier theory implies that such a curve defined over a field  has an affine model

In other words, if we define polynomial , then we require that .

Ramification
Let  be an Artin–Schreier curve.
Rational function  over an algebraically closed field  has partial fraction decomposition

If that is the case, we define

Then the set  is precisely the set of branch points of the covering .

For example, Artin–Schreier curve , where  is a polynomial, is ramified at a single point over the projective line.

Since the degree of the cover is a prime number, over each branching point  lies a single ramification point  with corresponding different (not to confused with the ramification index) equal to

Genus
Since  does not divide , ramification indices  are not divisible by  either. Therefore, the Riemann–Roch theorem may be used to compute that the genus of an Artin–Schreier curve is given by

For example, for a hyperelliptic curve defined over a field of characteristic  by equation  with  decomposed as above,

Generalizations
Artin–Schreier curves are a particular case of plane curves defined over an algebraically closed field  of characteristic  by an equation

for some separable polynomial  and rational function . Mapping  yields a covering map from the curve  to the projective line . Separability of defining polynomial  ensures separability of the corresponding function field extension . It has been shown  that such curves can be built via a sequence of Artin-Schreier extension, that is, there exists a sequence of cyclic coverings of curves

each of degree , starting with the projective line.

See also
 Artin–Schreier theory
 Hyperelliptic curve
 Superelliptic curve

References

 

Algebraic curves